Cliff is a small settlement on the Isle of Lewis, in the Outer Hebrides, Scotland. Cliff is within the parish of Uig. The settlement is situated on a minor road, off the B8011. The picturesque beach is unsafe for swimming. At low to mid tide holds an excellent barrelling beach break wave.

References

External links

Canmore - Lewis, Cliff site record
Canmore - Lewis, Cliff, Horizontal Mill site record
Canmore - Lewis, Cliff site record
Canmore - Lewis, Cliff site record

Villages in the Isle of Lewis